D'eux (French for "Of Them, "About Them", or "From Them"; homophonic with  , meaning "two") is the thirteenth studio album by Canadian singer Celine Dion, and her tenth French-language studio album. It was released by Columbia Records on 30 March 1995 in Canada and on 3 April 1995 in France. It was issued in other countries in the following months. In the United States, it was released under the title The French Album. D'eux was preceded by the lead hit single, "Pour que tu m'aimes encore". The album was mainly written and produced by French singer-songwriter, Jean-Jacques Goldman. It garnered favorable reviews from music critics and became the best-selling French-language album of all time, with sales of over ten million copies worldwide.

Background, release and content
D'eux was recorded in the Mega Studio in Paris, France, in November and December 1994. Jean-Jacques Goldman, a popular French singer and songwriter, wrote and produced eleven songs on the album. One track, "Cherche encore", was written by Erick Benzi. The album includes a duet with Goldman on "J'irai où tu iras", two successful singles "Pour que tu m'aimes encore" and "Je sais pas", and a song dedicated to Dion's niece who had died of cystic fibrosis, "Vole". The latter three tracks were recorded later in English as "If That's What It Takes", "I Don't Know" and "Fly" respectively, and were included on Dion's next album, Falling into You. D'eux was released on 30 March 1995 in Canada and on 3 April 1995 in France. It was also issued in other European countries between April and November 1995, and in the United States in May 1995. D'eux was also released in January 1996 in New Zealand, and in October 1996 in Japan. Dion's 2007 album title, D'elles, refers to D'eux, being the specifically feminine version.

Singles
The lead single, "Pour que tu m'aimes encore", was released in Quebec and in France in March 1995. It was also issued in other selected countries in the next months. "Pour que tu m'aimes encore" was very successful in Francophone countries. It topped the chart in France for twelve weeks and in Wallonian Belgium for fifteen consecutive weeks. The song also reached number one in Quebec and stayed there for four weeks. It became the best-selling single of the year 1995 in both France and Wallonia. In France alone, "Pour que tu m'aimes encore" has sold nearly one million copies. The song was also successful in other countries, reaching the top ten in Belgium Flanders, the Netherlands and Sweden. Most notably, it also peaked inside the top ten in the United Kingdom and Ireland, which was an exceptional achievement for a French-language song. On the European Hot 100 Singles, "Pour que tu m'aimes encore" reached number four.

The second single, "Je sais pas", was released in Quebec in July 1995, in Belgium in August 1995 and in France in October 1995. It topped the charts in France (for seven weeks), Wallonia (for two weeks) and Quebec (for four weeks). On the European Hot 100 Singles, the song peaked at number seven. "Je sais pas" became one of the best-selling singles in France and Wallonia in 1995, reaching  respectively numbers six and nine on the year-end charts.

"Le ballet" was issued in France in January 1996 as a promotional single. It reached number five on the Airplay Chart and was included as B-side on the next commercial single released in France, "Falling into You". Due to the success of D'eux, radio stations in Quebec started playing "Destin" in January 1996. The song spent over eight months on the Airplay Chart, peaking at number three. In May 1996, radio stations in Quebec also started playing "J'irai où tu iras", a duet with Jean-Jacques Goldman. This song reached number fourteen on the Quebec Airplay Chart. All singles from D'eux appeared on Dion's 2005 greatest hits album, On ne change pas.

Promotion
Dion promoted D'eux on television in Quebec and in France in late March and early April 1995. In mid-June 1995, she performed "Pour que tu m'aimes encore" in the United States on Good Morning America and The Tonight Show. These were her first performances of a French-language song on American television. She also taped the performance of "Pour que tu m'aimes encore" in New York for the British music chart television programme, Top of the Pops. In September 1995, Dion embarked on the D'eux Tour, starting with concerts in Quebec. Later, between October 1995 and February 1996, she performed over forty concerts in Europe. The shows at the Zénith de Paris were recorded and released as the Live à Paris CD and Live à Paris home video in 1996.

Accolades

At the Juno Awards of 1996, D'eux was nominated in three categories: Album of the Year, Best Selling Album (Foreign or Domestic) and Best Selling Francophone Album. Dion won in the latter category and was also nominated for Female Vocalist of the Year. In 1995, Dion was nominated for seven Félix Awards and won three of them in categories: Artist of the Year Achieving the Most Success Outside Quebec, Pop/Rock Album of the Year (D'eux) and Most Popular Song of the Year ("Pour que tu m'aimes encore"). The remaining nominations included among others: Female Vocalist of the Year, Best Selling Album of the Year (D'eux) and Video of the Year ("Pour que tu m'aimes encore"). In 1996, Dion was nominated for eight Félix Awards and won six of them in categories like: Artist of the Year Achieving the Most Success Outside Quebec, Female Vocalist of the Year, Best Selling Album of the Year (D'eux) and Show of the Year (D'eux Tour). "Je sais pas" was also nominated in categories: Most Popular Song of the Year and Video of the Year. Additionally, Dion's two television specials: Céline Dion - D'eux and Céline Dion - spécial d'enfer were nominated for Prix Gémeaux in 1995 and 1996.

In France in 1996, Dion was nominated for three Victoires de la Musique: Francophone Artist of the Year, Song of the Year ("Pour que tu m'aimes encore") and Music Video of the Year ("Pour que tu m'aimes encore"), and won in the first two categories. "Pour que tu m'aimes encore" also won Radio France Internationale Award in 1996 (Conseil Francophone de la chanson). In 1996, Dion received Ordre des Arts et des Lettres for the Best Selling French-Language Artist in History. The same year, she won a World Music Award for World's Best Selling Canadian Artist of the Year.

Critical reception
D'eux received positive reviews from music critics. Stephen Thomas Erlewine from AllMusic gave it three stars out of five. He noted that Jean-Jacques Goldman's songcraft, who wrote nearly all of the songs on the album, is remarkably similar to the adult contemporary pop that broadened Dion's international success. Erlewine wrote that the album is a well-constructed and entertaining adult pop record and on the whole, it sounds good. 

Emmanuel LeGrand from Billboard noted the unprecedented success of D'eux and how it broke boundaries all around the world saying: “The magnitude of Dion's success has overshadowed the rest of the crop.

Commercial performance
D'eux was a huge commercial success. It became the best-selling French-language album in history, with sales of more than ten million copies worldwide. In France, D'eux debuted at number one and stayed at the top of the chart for a record-breaking forty-four weeks. When Dion's next album, Falling into You, was released in March 1996, it debuted at number two, the top position still being occupied by D'eux. According to Billboard, D'eux has sold 2.3 million copies in France between April to December 1995. The album topped the 1995 Year-end Chart in France and on the 1996 Year-end Chart it was number four. In August 1995, D'eux was certified Diamond in France. Eventually, it has sold 4.5 million copies there and became the best-selling album of all time in France.

In Wallonia, D'eux spent thirty-seven weeks at the top of the chart, a record that still stands, and became the best-selling album of 1995. It also topped the chart in Belgium Flanders for four weeks. In 1997, D'eux was certified six-times platinum in Belgium and is one of the best-selling albums of all-time in this country. In Switzerland, D'eux topped the chart for five weeks and became the second best-selling album of the year 1995 and the best-selling album in 1996. In 1998, D'eux was certified four-times platinum in Switzerland and is one of the best-selling albums of all-time there. It also topped the chart in the Netherlands for two weeks and was certified platinum. In Quebec, the album topped the chart for thirty-four weeks. On the Canadian Albums Chart, D'eux peaked at number twenty-nine and was certified seven-times platinum in 1997 for sales of 700,000 copies.

Although a French-language album, D'eux charted and was certified in many non-French speaking countries. In the United Kingdom, it peaked at number seven, setting a record for a French release. It was certified gold there and has sold 250,000 copies. Dion became the first and only artist who achieved UK gold certification with a French-language recording. Later, she repeated this success with S'il suffisait d'aimer. Even in the United States, where it was released as The French Album, the album has sold 300,000 copies. D'eux also reached the top ten in Portugal, Denmark and Sweden. It was also certified platinum in Poland and gold in New Zealand. On the European Top 100 Albums, D'eux reached number three and eventually it was certified eight-times platinum by the IFPI for sales of eight million copies in Europe.

15th anniversary edition
To celebrate the 15th anniversary of D'eux, Legacy Recordings released in November 2009 in Europe and in December 2009 in Canada D'eux – 15th Anniversary Edition. on 27 November 2009 in France, It includes the CD with original album tracks plus three demos from the personal archives of Jean-Jacques Goldman ("Pour que tu m'aimes encore", "Le ballet", "J'irai où tu iras") and two instrumental versions of "Vole" and "Pour que tu m'aimes encore". It also contains an opendisc access to unpublished photographs of the cover sessions and listen to an alternate version of "J'attendais" with different lyrics by Goldman. The bonus DVD includes the Sonia Benezra's television special Spécial Dimanche from April 1995, distributed exclusively in Quebec, where Dion interpreted "Je sais pas", "J'irai où tu iras" in duet with Goldman, "Les derniers seront les premiers", "Pour que tu m'aimes encore" and "Vole". Between the songs, there were interviews with Dion and Goldman. It also includes four music videos: "Pour que tu m'aimes encore", "Les derniers seront les premiers", "J'attendais" and "Je sais pas". D'eux – 15th Anniversary Edition also includes a booklet of forty pages in a double digipack. It includes two previously unpublished texts by Goldman, one from 1995 to launch the album, and the other specially done for D'eux – 15th Anniversary Edition. There are also previously unpublished photographs of the sessions for the cover and reproduction of the text manuscript of Goldman's "Pour que tu m'aimes encore".

Track listing
All tracks produced by Jean-Jacques Goldman and Erick Benzi.

Personnel
Adapted from AllMusic.

 Beckie Bell – choir, chorus
 Erick Benzi – arranger, programming
 Sylvain Beuf – saxophone
 Chistopher Deschamps – drums
 Arnaud Dunoyer de Segonzac – piano
 Celine Dion – vocals
 Carole Fredericks – choir, chorus
 Claude Gassian – photography
 Humberto Gatica – mixing
 Jean-Jacques Goldman – arranger
 Emmanuel Goulet – assistant engineer
 Yannick Hardouin – bass
 Neil Jason – bass
 Yvone Jones – choir, chorus
 Denis Leloup – trombone
 Basil Leroux – guitar
 Vito Luprano – executive producer
 Christian Martinez – trumpet
 Christophe Negre – saxophone
 Frédéric Perrinet – assistant engineer
 Roland Romanelli – piano
 Antoine Russo – trumpet
 Patrice Tison – guitar
 Brian Vibberts – assistant engineer

Charts

Weekly charts

Year-end charts

Certifications and sales

Release history

See also
Juno Award for Francophone Album of the Year
List of best-selling albums by women
List of best-selling albums in Europe
List of best-selling albums in France

References

External links
 

1995 albums
Albums produced by Erick Benzi
Celine Dion albums
Columbia Records albums
Epic Records albums
Juno Award for Francophone Album of the Year albums